Serugudi Sukshmapureewarar Temple is a Hindu temple located in the village of Serugudi in the Tiruvarur district of Tamil Nadu, India. The presiding deity is Shiva.

Significance 

Hymns in praise of the temple have been sung by Sambandar.

Deities 

The presiding deity is Shiva. Apart from Shiva, there are also shrines to Ganesha, Murugan and the Navagrahas.

References 

 

Shiva temples in Tiruvarur district
Padal Petra Stalam